The 2006–07 season was the 109th season of competitive football played by Arsenal. It was the first season in which home matches were played at the over-60,000 capacity Emirates Stadium; the club's former ground Highbury was to be redeveloped as a residential development. Arsenal ended their Premier League campaign in fourth, level on points with third-placed Liverpool but with a marginally lower goal difference. In the League Cup, a competition which offered manager Arsène Wenger the chance to play his younger players, Arsenal reached the final but lost to a relatively experienced Chelsea side. The defeat was followed by exits in the FA Cup to Blackburn Rovers and in the UEFA Champions League to PSV Eindhoven.

Twenty-eight players represented Arsenal in four competitions and there were 18 goalscorers. Arsenal's top goalscorer was Robin van Persie, who scored 13 goals in 31 appearances.

Transfers

In

Out

Club

Coaching staff

Kit 
Supplier: Nike / Sponsor: Fly Emirates

Kit information 
All of the new Arsenal kit this season was featured with new sponsor, Fly Emirates. Replaced with previous sponsor, O2.
 
 Home: The new home kit returned to a solid iconic Arsenal red shirt with white sleeves, white shorts and white socks, the colours Arsenal are well known for, after the last season saw a redcurrant 'anniversary' kit in final season at Highbury. The new features added to the home kit was a red band appearing on the sleeves and socks, while the golden trimmings appeared on the side of the shirt. The home was usually worn with white socks, however red socks were worn in some away games in order to prevent confusion.
 Away: The yellow and dark grey away kit from last season was unchanged, albeit with new sponsor.
 Keeper: The goalkeeper kit were based on Nike's Harlequin template, which was basically a strip split into subtle halves in two tones of one colour. The main kit was green, but the black and yellow kit were available should they be required.

Other information

Premier League

August–October

Arsenal's league season began with their first-ever match at the new Emirates Stadium, against an Aston Villa side who had struggled with relegation threats the previous season. However, the Gunners` performance did not match the pre-game expectations; the sides drew 1-1, Gilberto Silva scoring a late equaliser after Olof Mellberg put Villa ahead; a bright spark for Arsenal was youngster Theo Walcott, who had helped create the goal with a fine run after making his debut as a substitute.
The Gunners then disappointingly lost 1–0 to Manchester City to a Joey Barton penalty just before the break, having dominated the match and spurned numerous chances.

The Gunners then hosted Middlesbrough in their second league match at the Emirates, and once again were forced to come from behind in a strangely similar game to the Villa one; James Morrison gave Boro the lead, before Thierry Henry opened his account for the season from the penalty spot to salvage a point for Arsenal.

The Gunners finally registed their first win of the season, claiming a magnificent 1–0 victory at Old Trafford against to-be champions Manchester United, thanks to a late Emmanuel Adebayor goal and some heroic defending, including a stunning fingertip save from Jens Lehmann against United striker Ole Gunnar Solskjaer. This was followed by a first-ever league win at the Emirates; second-half goals from William Gallas and Thierry Henry either side of a Phil Jagielka own goal gave the Gunners a comfortable 3–0 victory over Sheffield United. They then were forced to come from behind away to Charlton Athletic; however a Robin van Persie double, including a stunning edge-of-the box flying volley, gave the Gunners a 2–1 victory to close out the month in eighth position.
October began with a fine 3–0 win over Watford, Arsenal's second in a row by that scoreline at the Emirates. An own goal from Jordan Stewart and strikes from Henry and Emmanuel Adebayor took the Gunners to fifth position in the league. The Gunners managed to crack the top four for the first time that season thanks to a convincing 4-0 trouncing of Premier League newboys Reading at the Madejski Stadium. Two for Henry, including one from the spot, and further goals for Alexander Hleb and Robin van Persie gave the Gunners a convincing victory. The Gunners then concluded October with more silly dropped points at the Emirates, van Persie's free-kick not enough as the Gunners drew 1–1 with Everton.

November–February

Overall November was a poor month for Arsenal, with just one win and one draw in the five games played. A late goal from Marlon Harewood saw the Gunners sloppily lose 1–0 at West Ham United, before goals from Kolo Toure, William Gallas and Mathieu Flamini gave the Gunners a stunning 3–0 victory against Liverpool. However, a draw with Newcastle at the Emirates, only salvaged by Thierry Henry's late free-kick, was followed by back to back defeats at Bolton and Fulham by scorelines of 3-1 and 2-1 respectively, with Gilberto Silva scoring at Bolton and Robin van Persie in Craven Cottage.
December began with the first-ever north London derby at the Emirates Stadium against Tottenham Hotspur, which was decided ultimately by two controversial penalty calls from referee Graham Poll; both were converted by Gilberto Silva either side of half-time to add to Emmanuel Adebayor's opener as Arsenal won 3–0. Another London derby followed, this time at Stamford Bridge against Premier League title-holders Chelsea, where a hotly-contested derby ended 1-1 after Michael Essien responded to Mathieu Flamini's strike late in the match. The Gunners then claimed a dramatic late win at Wigan thanks to Adebayor to move third in the table, before staging a two-goal comeback to draw 2–2 with Portsmouth at the Emirates with Adebayor and stand-in captain Silva on the scoresheet. The Gunners then concluded the first half of the season with a 6-2 dismantling of Blackburn Rovers at the Emirates, claiming their biggest win at the new venue to date. Shabani Nonda actually put Blackburn in front with a penalty just three minutes in, but goals from Gilberto Silva, Alexander Hleb and a penalty from Adebayor gave Arsenal a 3–1 lead before half an hour was up. Nonda pulled one back for Blackburn with his second in the second half, but three goals in the last eight minutes through a brace from van Persie and a third of the season for Mathieu Flamini sealed a big victory. Van Persie scored a late winner at Watford after Tommy Smith had responded to Gilberto Silva's opener, taking the Gunners up to third in the table. However, they ended the year in fifth after a dramatic 1–0 loss at newly promoted and relegation-doomed Sheffield United, with Blades defender Phil Jagielka filling in goals for half an hour, as Arsenal concluded the year with an embarrassing defeat. 
Arsenal responded to the loss at Bramall Lane with a thumping win over relegation-doomed Charlton Athletic to start the year-a rare goal for Justin Hoyte, a penalty for Thierry Henry and a brace, including one penalty, for Robin van Persie handed the Gunners a 4–0 win to start the year. Captain Henry was particularly impressive on his return from injury after 34 days, delivering an assist as well as his goal and winning the second penalty. He then netted a fine curling effort and delivered another assist in a 2–0 win at Blackburn Rovers, before a big clash at home to Manchester United-after Wayne Rooney gave United the lead, Henry set up van Persie for an equaliser before heading in a 93rd-minute winner, in what was the club's 200th meeting with United to date.
Henry was again the hero, netting a late equaliser at Middlesbrough after Yakubu's penalty had put Boro ahead in a 1-1 draw. An own goal from Fritz Hall and a first Premier League goal for Tomas Rosicky in the last ten minutes earned the Gunners a dramatic 2-1 victory over Wigan, closing out the month in fourth place.

March–May

March began with a penalty from Gilberto Silva and a first league goal for the Gunners from Julio Baptista giving them a 2-1 win against Reading. This was followed by a narrow 1-0 success at Aston Villa, thanks to an early Abou Diaby strike, as Arsenal rose to third position. They consolidated this place despite performing poorly in a 1-0 defeat at Everton. Returning to Merseyside nearly a fortnight later, Arsenal were crushed 4-1 by Liverpool, who were inspired by Peter Crouch, who netted a "perfect" hat-trick of left foot, right foot and head; William Gallas scored Arsenal's consolation as they slipped to fourth in the table.
A string of fine saves from visiting goalkeeper Robert Green, as well as many missed chances, saw the Gunners beaten 1–0 at the Emirates against West Ham United-their first defeat at the venue. Another lacklustre display saw them draw 0–0 at Newcastle  before returning to winning ways against Bolton; after falling behind to Nicolas Anelka's goal, Tomas Rosicky and Cesc Fabregas struck as the Gunners turned it around to win it 2–1 against the ten-men Trotters. Fabregas and Rosicky were both again on the scoresheet, alongside Julio Baptista, as they beat Manchester City 3–1 at the Emirates. In a big north London derby at White Hart Lane, Arsenal fell behind half an hour in before turning it around with Kolo Toure and Emmanuel Adebayor; however they were denied a win thanks to a late Jermaine Jenas equaliser. They concluded the month with a league match against struggling Fulham at the Emirates; after Julio Baptista gave the Gunners an early lead, Fulham pegged them back with twelve minutes left before a late strike from Adebayor and a penalty from Gilberto Silva gave the Gunners a 3–1 win. 
The Gunners began May with a London derby at the Emirates against Chelsea. The champions needed a victory to take their title race with Manchester United to the final day, but a penalty from Gilberto Silva and a red card from Khalid Boulahrouz had them trailing by a goal and a man at the break. Despite eventually drawing the match 1-1, they lost the league to United, whilst Arsenal stayed fourth. The Gunners concluded their season at Portsmouth, drawing 0–0 to finish the season in fourth position.

Matches

Classification

Standings

Results summary

Results by round

UEFA Champions League 

Having finished fourth in the Premier League the previous season, Arsenal entered the Champions League at the third qualifying round stage, and were duly drawn against Croatians Dinamo Zagreb. In the first leg in Zagreb, the home side held Arsenal off for over an hour before two goals in a minute for Cesc Fabregas and Robin van Persie established a 2–0 lead for Arsenal; Fabregas sealed his brace late on as Arsenal took a convincing lead to London. Despite falling behind to a goal after 12 minutes from future Arsenal striker Eduardo, late goals from Invincible Freddie Ljungberg and Mathieu Flamini gave the Gunners their first win at the Emirates and a 5-1 aggregate victory. 
Arsenal were drawn in Group G, alongside Portuguese champions Porto, German outfit Hamburg and Russians CSKA Moscow. A stunning second-half goal from Tomas Rosicky sealed three points in Hamburg before goals from Thierry Henry and Alexander Hleb gave them a 2–0 win over Porto. A disappointing set of results against CSKA Moscow followed; Arsenal lost 1–0 in Russia before being held to a goalless draw at the Emirates, however they bounced back with a 3–1 win over Hamburg before sealing top spot in the group through a goalless draw at Porto. 
As a seeded side, Arsenal got what was considered a favourable round-of-16 draw against Dutch side PSV Eindhoven, but crashed out 2–1 on aggregate, with a 1–1 draw at the Emirates failing to make up for a poor 1–0 defeat in the Netherlands.

Third qualifying round

Group stage

Knockout phase

Round of 16

FA Cup 

Arsenal began their FA Cup campaign in the third round, where they faced a tough draw in the form of fellow Premier League side Liverpool at Anfield. However, a first-half brace from Tomas Rosicky and a late strike from Thierry Henry gave the Gunners an excellent 3–1 win, shortly before a 6-3 League Cup win at the same venue. The Gunners drew Premier League team Bolton Wanderers in the fourth round, and were hard-put to it against their bogey team, drawing 1–1 at the Emirates before being forced into extra-time at the Reebok. However, an Emmanuel Adebayor double and a goal from Freddie Ljungberg eventually gave them a 3–1 win. The Gunners however were eliminated in the next round; after a goalless draw at the Emirates, Arsenal lost their fifth-round replay 1–0 to Blackburn Rovers.

League Cup 

Arsenal entered the competition in the third round and faced West Bromwich Albion at
The Hawthorns, where striker Aliadière scored twice to secure a 2–0 victory for the visitors. They then travelled to Goodison Park in the fourth round to play Everton. Arsenal won the match 0–1 courtesy of a late Adebayor goal, which came from a corner. For much of the game Everton played with a man disadvantage as striker James McFadden was sent off in the 19th minute for dissent.

Liverpool were Arsenal's opponent in the fifth round. The match, scheduled on 19 December 2006 at Anfield, was postponed by referee Martin Atkinson because of heavy fog. Atkinson's decision infuriated the managers of both clubs, with Rafael Benítez commenting: "There were a lot of people looking forward to the game and it's really difficult to explain." The tie was rescheduled for 9 January 2007 and on the night Arsenal took the lead when Aliadière scored in the 27th minute. Robbie Fowler equalised for Liverpool six minutes later. Later, two goals from Baptista and goal from Alex Song put Arsenal 4–1 ahead at half time. In the second half, Baptista completed his hat-trick; although Steven Gerrard and Sami Hyypiä scored to close the scoreline gap for Liverpool, Baptista added his fourth goal of the match in the 84th minute. The final score was 6–3, Liverpool's heaviest defeat at Anfield in 76 years. In his match report for The Guardian, Taylor praised Arsenal's reserve team and summarised, "The difference between the two teams was immense. Arsenal played with flair and purpose; Liverpool were dishevelled and short of leadership."

Tottenham Hotspur faced Arsenal in the semi-final which was played over two legs. A goal from Dimitar Berbatov gave Tottenham the lead in the 12th minute and they extended their advantage after Baptista inadvertently kicked the ball into his own goal. Baptista, however, made amends in the second half, scoring twice in the space of 13 minutes to level the score at 2–2. The second leg at the Emirates Stadium saw Arsenal dominate proceedings, but only took the lead in the 77th minute when Adebayor scored. Mido equalised for Tottenham, which took the match into extra time because of the away goals rule. Aliadière's goal in the 105th minute restored Arsenal's lead and an own goal scored by Pascal Chimbonda ensured the home team progressed to the final, winning 3–1 after extra time and 5–3 on aggregate.

Arsenal played Chelsea in the final at the Millennium Stadium on 25 February 2007. Wenger continued his policy of naming a young team, which took the lead in the 12th minute when Walcott converted his chance. Chelsea striker Didier Drogba equalised and scored in the 84th minute to earn his side victory. A fracas occurred between the Arsenal and Chelsea players occurred during stoppage time, resulting in Touré and Adebayor getting shown a red card each. Wenger later apologised for his players' conduct, but was charged £2,500 for accusing the linesman of lying in his account of Adebayor's actions. Both clubs were fined £100,000 each by The Football Association for their inability to control their players and Eboué was retrospectively charged with violent conduct for striking Wayne Bridge.

Squad statistics 

|}

See also 

 2006–07 in English football
 List of Arsenal F.C. seasons

References 

Arsenal F.C. seasons
Arsenal
Articles containing video clips